Minister for Fisheries is a position in the government of Western Australia, currently held by Peter Tinley of the Labor Party. The position was first created after the 1947 state election, in the new ministry formed by Ross McLarty. It has existed in every government since then, sometimes under different titles. The minister is currently responsible for the state government's Fisheries within the Department of Primary Industries and Regional Development. It is responsible for commercial and recreational fishing in Western Australia.

Titles
 1 April 1947 – 16 March 1965: Minister for Fisheries
 16 March 1965 – 20 December 1974: Minister for Fisheries and Fauna
 20 December 1974 – 20 December 1984: Minister for Fisheries and Wildlife
 20 December 1984 – present: Minister for Fisheries

List of ministers

See also
 Minister for Agriculture and Food (Western Australia)
 Minister for the Environment (Western Australia)

References
 David Black (2014), The Western Australian Parliamentary Handbook (Twenty-Third Edition). Perth [W.A.]: Parliament of Western Australia.

Fisheries
Minister for Fisheries